James Harry Preston (March 23, 1860 – July 14, 1938) was the Mayor of Baltimore from 1911 to 1919. He also served in the Maryland House of Delegates

Early life
James H. Preston was born at Preston's Hill in Harford County, Maryland on March 23, 1860 to Amelia (née Wilks) and James B. Preston. He attended Bel Air Academy and St. John's College in Annapolis. He graduated from University of Maryland School of Law in 1881 with a Bachelor of Laws.

Career
In 1881, Preston entered the law office of George M. Gill and after Gill's death went into practice with his son, John Gill Jr.

Preston was elected as a Democrat to the Maryland House of Delegates in 1889. He served in that role from 1890 to 1894. He briefly served as Speaker of the Maryland House of Delegates in 1894. He served as a member of the Board of Police Commissioners of Baltimore from 1904 to 1908. Preston was backed by political boss John J. Mahon for nomination for Mayor of Baltimore in 1911. He served as the Mayor of Baltimore from 1911 to 1919. During his tenure as Mayor, the Hanover Street Bridge was built and the Baltimore Symphony Orchestra was founded. A number of civil works projects occurred while he was mayor, including paving and modernizing streets and removal of buildings on St. Paul Street into gardens and parked spaces.

In 1912, he was a delegate to the Democratic National Convention. While there, he received a few votes for the vice presidential nomination. In 1919, he was defeated by George Weems Williams in the primary election for mayor. He was appointed to the Port Development Commission by Mayor Broening. He was later appointed chairman of the Commission by Mayor Jackson. He ran again for mayor in the 1923 election under an independent ticket and lost again. He then chose to withdraw from political life.

Preston served as the 32nd President General of the Sons of the American Revolution. He was the first president and then vice president of Calvert Bank. He was also the president of Jones Falls Improvement Association.

Personal life
Preston married Helen Fiske Jackson, daughter of Wilbur F. Jackson and niece of Elihu Emory Jackson, on November 14, 1894. Together, they had two sons and three daughters: Wilbur, James, Alice, Helen and Mary.

His brother was Walter W. Preston, an associate judge of the third judicial court. He was friends with John Mahon.

His family lived in a mansion on Charles Street in Baltimore built by William Key Howard in 1870. It was later the home of Governor Frank Brown.

Death
Preston died on July 14, 1938 at his home in Baltimore. He is buried at Green Mount Cemetery.

Legacy
In 1917, Preston Gardens were built and named after Preston on St. Paul Street in Baltimore.

References

External links

1860 births
1938 deaths
People from Harford County, Maryland
St. John's College (Annapolis/Santa Fe) alumni
University of Maryland, Baltimore alumni
Maryland lawyers
Mayors of Baltimore
Members of the Maryland House of Delegates